A statue of Christopher Columbus is installed in Atlantic City, New Jersey, United States. The memorial is slated for removal, as of June 2020.

References

Buildings and structures in Atlantic City, New Jersey
Monuments and memorials in New Jersey
Outdoor sculptures in New Jersey
Sculptures of men in New Jersey
Statues in New Jersey
Atlantic City, New Jersey